Cheltenham Bournside School is a coeducational secondary school and sixth form with academy status, located in Cheltenham, Gloucestershire, England. The school was initially set up as Gloucester Road Elementary Schools for 300 students of all ages, with separate schools for girls, boys, and infants. It became Cheltenham Bournside School in 1972. The school was last inspected on 27 September 2022, and prior to this in September 2016.

It is situated in the south-west of Cheltenham, in the Warden Hill area.  It is currently the largest school in Gloucestershire.

Uniform 

Cheltenham Bournside students in Years 7–11 wear a uniform of a blue blazer, badged black trousers, and a white shirt.  Ties differ by house.

In the sixth form, students currently wear 'smart business' clothes - this must include a shirt, the sixth form badged tie, smart trousers or skirt, and either brown or black shoes.  This is due to change to a uniform for the 2023 intake.

For sport, main school students are required to wear a white or navy polo shirt with navy shorts.  Outside, students must wear badged navy sports socks, and boys must also wear the school's blue rugby jersey.

Houses
The school has 6 Houses, named after famous people. They are currently Attenborough, Frank, Hawking, Owens, Parks and Rowling.
Prior to this the 6 Houses were called Brontie, Curie, Fry, Holst, Pitt and Wren.

Tutor groups, which are organised by house, are vertical - in the main school there are 6 students from each of the years 7 - 11 in every tutor group.  Sixth form tutor groups are separate but also vertical.

Notable former pupils
 Tom Thurlow, British entrepreneur
Jaz Coleman, singer and composer 
Leon Taylor, Olympic diver, silver medalist at Athens 2004
Rob Varley, Chief Executive of the Met Office
Jack Clement, rugby player

References

External links
 Cheltenham Bournside School Website

Secondary schools in Gloucestershire
Schools in Cheltenham
Academies in Gloucestershire
Educational institutions established in 1993
1993 establishments in England